Viktor Yuriyovych Lykhovydko (born 13 April 1992) is a Ukrainian professional footballer who plays as a defender for Górnik Łęczna.

Career 
Lykhovydko started his senior career with Arsenal Kyiv. After that he played for  Yednist Plysky, Regar-TadAZ Tursunzoda, Arsenal-Kyivshchyna Bila Tserkva, Veres Rivne, and Sumy. In 2019 he signed for Hirnyk-Sport Horishni Plavni in the Ukrainian First League, where he made twenty-nine appearances and scored three goals.

On 20 May 2022, he joined Polish fifth division side Narew Ostrołęka on a short-term loan. Shortly after, on 30 June, he signed a one-year contract with an extension option with I liga club Górnik Łęczna.

References

External links 
Likhovidko begins to open Tajikistan
Viktor Likhovidko: "It is important to observe the sporting principle" 
Будем знакомы: Виктор Лиховидько (видео)
Victor Likhovidko. Goals, moments and scored goal of Volhynia 
 
 

1992 births
Living people
People from Bila Tserkva
Ukrainian footballers
Association football defenders
Zenit Boyarka players
FC Chornomorets Odesa players
FC Yednist Plysky players
Regar-TadAZ Tursunzoda players
FC Arsenal-Kyivshchyna Bila Tserkva players
NK Veres Rivne players
PFC Sumy players
FC Hirnyk-Sport Horishni Plavni players
FC Mynai players
Górnik Łęczna players
Ukrainian Premier League players
Ukrainian First League players
Ukrainian Second League players
Ukrainian Amateur Football Championship players
IV liga players
I liga players
Ukrainian expatriate footballers
Expatriate footballers in Tajikistan
Ukrainian expatriate sportspeople in Tajikistan
Expatriate footballers in Poland
Ukrainian expatriate sportspeople in Poland